Pygocentrus palometa is a species of piranha native to South America, where restricted to the Orinoco Basin. Although recognized by FishBase, the scientific name may be a nomen dubium.

"Palometa" is a general common name used in South America for many serrasalmids, such as the black spot piranha, red-bellied piranha, redhook myleus, wimple piranha, Metynnis, Mylossoma, Pygopristis denticulata, Pristobrycon striolatus and Serrasalmus, as well as the unrelated marine fish Beryx, Brama, Trachinotus goodei and Taractichthys.

References

Piranhas
Fish of South America
Serrasalmidae
Taxa named by Achille Valenciennes
Fish described in 1850